Dillwyn v Llewelyn [1862] is an 'English' land, probate and contract law case which established an example of proprietary estoppel at the testator's wish overturning his last Will and Testament; the case concerned land in Wales demonstrating the united jurisdiction of England and Wales.

The sole appellate judge, the Lord Chancellor of England and Wales held: "by virtue of the original gift made by the testator and of the subsequent expenditure by the Plaintiff with the approbation [approval] of the testator, and of the right and obligation resulting therefrom, the Plaintiff is entitled to have a conveyance."

Facts
In 1847 the parties' father (Lewis Weston Dillwyn of Sketty Hall) earlier bequeathed his lands on trust to his widow for life and with a complex remainder so that his younger son, the "plaintiff", would inherit absolutely if he obtained 21 years of age; otherwise charged with annuities (equity partly-released) for certain daughters and thereafter to the defendant (and his heirs).

He later wished to give immediately to the plaintiff (Lewis Llewelyn Dillwyn) one of these parcels, his farm at Hendrefoilan near to Sketty Hall, and thought he had done so by signing a memorandum presenting it to him “for the purpose of furnishing himself with a dwelling-house”. The memorandum was not a deed — a proper deed would make it binding to all the world at common law. The younger son, the plaintiff, incurred great expense in building a house on the land. The elder son and father signed and dated the memorandum. Two years later in 1855 the father died and the elder son (John Dillwyn Llewelyn) disputed his younger brother's imperfect title (ownership).  The widow, noted photographer, Mary Dillwyn died in 1906 and chose to waive her life interest in the property.

At first instance, Sir John Romilly MR decreed that the claimant was entitled to a life interest (possession for life in the estate in land, worth £14,000).

Judgment
Lord Westbury L.C. on appeal held that the younger son had an incomplete gift and was on the facts entitled to call for a legal conveyance of the whole freehold (fee simple). His reasoning was:

See also

English contract law
English land law
Formalities in English law
Probate#England and Wales
Willmott v Barber (1880) 15 Ch D 96, Fry J, in a court of first instance, said proprietary estoppel requires a mistake about rights, reliance, defendant has knowledge of his own right, know of the claimant's mistaken belief and have encouraged reliance
Syros Shipping Co SA v Elaghill Trading Co or The Proodos C [1981] 3 All ER 189 applied the doctrine as formulated by Lord Denning when he was a first instance judge in Central London Property Trust Ltd v High Trees House Ltd [1947] KB 130; [1956] 1 All ER 256; 62 TLR 557, KBD

References

English contract case law
English land case law
English estoppel case law
1862 in case law
1862 in British law
Court of Chancery cases